Raja Shahid Zafar is a Pakistani politician and was elected twice as the member of the National Assembly of Pakistan from 1985 to 1988 and 1988 to 1990. He also served as a minister of state for production and industries.

He was educated at Gordon College, Rawalpindi.

References

Living people
Government Gordon College alumni
Government ministers of Pakistan
Punjabi people
Pakistan People's Party MNAs
Pakistani MNAs 1985–1988
Pakistani MNAs 1988–1990
Year of birth missing (living people)